Spivakovsky is a surname. Notable people with the surname include:

Adolf Spivakovsky (1891–1958), Russian-born Australian vocal teacher
Daniil Spivakovsky (born 1969), Russian film and theater actor
Jacob Spivakovsky, Russian actor
Jascha Spivakovsky (1896–1970), Ukrainian pianist
Tossy Spivakovsky (1906–1998), American violinist